Planthouse is a contemporary gallery and project space located in New York City, in the United States committed to publishing emerging and established artists. The archive of Planthouse can be found at the Beinecke Rare Book & Manuscript Library at Yale University in New Haven, Connecticut. Planthouse publications are in the collections of The Metropolitan Museum of Art, and the Beinecke Rare Book & Manuscript Library.

History 
Planthouse was founded in 2013 in a former flower shop by Katie Michel. The gallery took its namesake from its location in New York City's flower district.  In 2015, Planthouse moved to its current home on West 28th street between Broadway and 6th Avenue.

Artist collaborations 

The Floral Ghost (2016), Susan Orlean, Philip Taaffe

Giraffe (2016), Katherine Bradford

43 Monsters (2014), Arthur Bradford, Chuck Webster

The Floral Ghost Print Portfolio (2014), Simryn Gill, Florian Meisenberg, Katia Santibañez, Philip Taaffe, Fred Tomaselli, Anton Würth

References

External links 
 
 Anthony Haden-Guest (October 29, 2014), New York Observer/Culture: The X-Chromosome Factor

Art museums and galleries in New York City
2013 establishments in New York City
Midtown Manhattan